Willem Abraham Viljoen (born 5 March 1985) is a South African badminton player. He competed for South Africa at the 2012 London Summer Olympics, and at the Glasgow 2014 Commonwealth Games. At the All-African Games, he has collected 2 golds and six silvers. Her sister Annari Viljoen also the Olympian who was competed in London 2012.

Achievements

All African  Games 
Men's doubles

Mixed doubles

African  Championships 
Men's singles

Men's doubles

Mixed doubles

BWF International Challenge/Series (24 titles, 13 runners-up)
Men's singles

Men's doubles

Mixed doubles

 BWF International Challenge tournament
 BWF International Series tournament
 BWF Future Series tournament

References

External links
 
 
 
 
 

South African male badminton players
1985 births
Living people
Sportspeople from Bloemfontein
Badminton players at the 2012 Summer Olympics
Olympic badminton players of South Africa
Badminton players at the 2014 Commonwealth Games
Commonwealth Games competitors for South Africa
Competitors at the 2007 All-Africa Games
Competitors at the 2011 All-Africa Games
Competitors at the 2015 African Games
African Games gold medalists for South Africa
African Games silver medalists for South Africa
African Games medalists in badminton